Gorodishche is a rural locality (a selo) in Krasnoselskoye Rural Settlement, Yuryev-Polsky District, Vladimir Oblast, Russia. The population was 420 as of 2010. There are 5 streets.

Geography 
Gorodishche is located 13 km north of Yuryev-Polsky (the district's administrative centre) by road. Yurkovo is the nearest rural locality.

References 

Rural localities in Yuryev-Polsky District